Nathan Pine is an accomplished athletic administrator and the current Director of Athletics at the United States Air Force Academy. Since taking over at Air Force in 2019, Pine has led the Falcons to new heights of competitive success, fundraising and resource generation and facility improvements.

Prior to Air Force he served as athletic director at the College of the Holy Cross from 2013 to 2019. Pine oversaw impressive growth at Holy Cross during his tenure there to include NCAA post-season appearances in men’s basketball and baseball in addition to record fundraising growth and facility construction. Prior to Holy Cross, Pine was the deputy athletic director at the University of Maryland where   Pine directly supervised all of the external support units and revenue generation for the department including development, marketing, media relations, ticket operations and video services.

From 2008-2011, Pine was at the University of California at Berkeley, where as associate athletic director he oversaw all aspects of the major gift program and development staff for athletics. Pine led the university’s athletics fundraising capital campaign, an unprecedented $500 million effort.

Pine spent four years at the United States Military Academy from 2005-2008, where he managed all business initiatives for Army and oversight of the external and revenue generating operations for athletics.

He will serve as the athletic director at the United States Air Force Academy beginning in January 2019.

He began his administrative career at Oregon State University where he was instrumental in the fundraising and renovation of Reser Stadium during his time there from 2000-2005. Pine has an undergraduate degree from Oregon State University in business administration and a master's degree in education from University of California at Berkeley.

References

External links
Air Force Falcons bio

Year of birth missing (living people)
Place of birth missing (living people)
Living people
Air Force Falcons athletic directors
Holy Cross Crusaders athletic directors
Oregon State University people
University of Maryland, College Park staff
University of California, Berkeley people
United States Military Academy people
People from Eagle Point, Oregon